Six Flags America is a theme park located in the Woodmore CDP of Prince George's County, Maryland, near Upper Marlboro, and in the Washington, DC metropolitan area.

Founded as a wildlife center in 1973 by Ross Perot, ABC television operated the park as a drive-through safari called The Largo Wildlife Preserve beginning in 1974 until its closure in 1978. The property was bought by Jim Fowler's Wild Kingdom; thereafter the site was gradually converted from a wildlife preserve into a theme park named Wild World. In 1992, the park was renamed Adventure World after being acquired by Premier Parks, and ultimately was branded as the 10th Six Flags park when Premier Parks acquired Six Flags Inc. and adopted its name in 1999. The "America" in the park's name was chosen due to the park's proximity to the U.S. capital.

History

Early years

ABC television later bought out Perot and his partners. The newly-acquired park opened as a drive-through animal safari, The Wildlife Preserve, on July 16, 1974. Initially, estimated attendance was approximately 850,000 visitors a year.

Those reasonably ambitious visitor projections never materialized. In 1975, the park added narrated tours through four-car, 150-person-capacity trains. However, the park failed to generate public interest or profits. By 1976, ABC bowed out, citing massive losses. The park stayed open with a decreased staff in 1977, but was closed altogether for the 1978 season.

Before the year 1978 came to an end, however, the park was sold to Jim Fowler, the host of Wild Kingdom. For the 1979 season, the park reopened with a guided train tour through the safari exhibits, and a smaller park with a children's playground, animal shows, and a petting zoo. Alas, the park continued to flounder in terms of public interest, yet nevertheless remained operational for the  summer, through the 1979 season. Fowler's company ultimately bowed out as well. The park again was closed for the 1980 season.

Wild World 

In the Summer of 1980, the safari was sold to a group of local businessmen, who invested $11 million dollars into expanding the park. The animal drive-through safari remained, and the park added three flat rides, two kid’s rides and a carousel. The park was named Wild World and open by June 26, 1982. In addition to the select amusement rides, four tube waterslides were added, along with two body slides and a children's water play area. This brought modest improvements in revenue.

The 1983 season saw the addition of four more flat rides, including the High Seas (a swinging pirate ship attraction) and giant swings. The waterslide area was expanded, at the time, to a full water park; with the addition of more water slides and a large wave pool, a more successful 1983 season was underway. Dubbed the 'Wild Wave', $2 million was spent adding the wave pool and it officially opened May 30 for the 1983 season.

Tragically, a 9-year-old boy named Christie Davis died late that summer, swimming in the Wave Pool, which resulted in operational safety changes. The park's attendance had improved, but the park was still unable to break even. During the 1983 season, the animal drive-through safari would close; alternately, a guided train ride would depart from the main train station, pass through a few of the animal areas, to the Safari Village, then to the rest of the animal area, and finally arrive back at the station. The Safari Village featured elephant, camel and pony rides, a petting zoo, various eateries, arts-and-crafts, and games, including the crowd favorite “Guess Your Age Or Weight” game (featuring Regina Williams) - this would prove so popular that it was relocated to the main park. The animals were sold and moved after the 1983 season ended. In 1984, most of the adult rides were removed from the park and held in storage, leaving only three, plus a few of the children's rides. The park opted to move in the direction of being solely a water park. A new stadium was built that year, along with several more water slides. The park would perform very well on hot days, but faltered a bit more in cooler weather, due to the shift in predominantly swimming- and water-based attractions.

In 1985, the rides were therefore brought back out of storage. That year, Wild World's management wanted to build a major wooden rollercoaster for the park in the 1986 season, but the costs were too high. There was widespread opposition to the plan from the surrounding community. In addition to adding a roller coaster, the park intended to add a 3000 seat amphitheater, and an overnight campground for guests.

At the time, Knoebels park (in Pennsylvania) had acquired a used rollercoaster called the Phoenix, from a defunct park in Texas. Wild World's management team began looking for a used coaster for Wild World.

Paragon Park closed at the end of 1984. The Giant Coaster, which had operated there since 1917, was put up for sale. During the spring of 1985, Wild World bought the old wooden coaster, rebranding it The Wild One and rebuilding the ride in an area of the former animal park. The coaster opened for the spring of 1986 to very positive public reviews. A kiddie coaster was added to the park at the same time.

For the 1987 season, Wild World added another water play area and a new lazy river. In 1988, the park would see a renovation to its buildings and midways, and an additional  few new flat rides. In 1989, a log flume was added, along with a family raft waterslide in the water park area. In 1990, the park began to have maintenance issues with many of their carnival-style flat rides, with several unable to be repaired. In 1991, only nine flat rides remained and the park was ultimately put up for sale.

Adventure World

In 1992, Wild World was purchased by Tierco Group Inc., later known as Premier Parks, and renamed the park Adventure World. That year several flat rides and a few kiddie rides were added. In 1993, Adventure World added its second adult rollercoaster. Premier Parks had acquired Lightning Loops from Six Flags. This was a dual-track steel single looping shuttle coaster located at Six Flags Great Adventure. One of the tracks was sent to Premier Parks' Frontier City located in Oklahoma City (where it still operates today as the Diamondback), while the other track became known as the Python and would be located at Adventure World. Also, a water ride called Shipwreck Falls, in which a 15-person boat would run up a steel track and down a  drop into a splashwater pool, was added. More flat rides were added in 1994. By this time, the new additions were well-received, shown as Inside Track Magazine named Adventure World as the most improved amusement park in the country for a third consecutive year in 1994.

On May 20, 1995, Vekoma's first Mind Eraser, an inverted looping suspended coaster, opened. This was branded a SLC. In 1996, a free-fall drop-tower ride called the Tower of Doom, now known as Voodo Drop, made by Intamin was added. In 1997, the park added a second dry water ride called Typhoon Sea Coaster, which was a log flume/junior rollercoaster hybrid. It was later renamed Skull Mountain and eventually closed in July 2011 to make room for a new roller coaster. In 1997, the water park was renovated, eliminating some older slides, adding newer slides and extensively remodeling the children's water play area.

Six Flags ownership

In 1998, Premier Parks acquired the Six Flags amusement park chain from Time Warner, forming the company Six Flags Incorporated. The same year, a wooden roller coaster called Roar, which was built and designed by Great Coasters International, was added to Adventure World. At the end of 1998 season, Six Flags announced that Adventure World would be branded with the Six Flags theme and renamed Six Flags America for the 1999 season. The park was officially renamed Six Flags America on October 28, 1998, and a large gala was thrown at the park to commemorate the change. Carrot cake was served in honor of Bugs Bunny the new mascot for the park. The name change allowed for the park to utilize the Looney Tunes and DC characters in its marketing. 

Other changes included the addition of Gotham City, a new section in the park, and three new coasters – Two Face: The Flip Side, The Joker's Jinx (the park's only launched roller coaster), and Great Chase replacing Cannonball in the kiddie area. Python was closed and moved into storage.

For the 2000 season, a new hypercoaster called Superman: Ride of Steel from Intamin opened. Its layout is a mirror image of Six Flags Darien Lake's Ride of Steel which opened the previous year. The next year on June 16, the park opened Batwing, a Batman-themed Vekoma flying coaster located in the Gotham City area. A bungee ride called Skycoaster also opened in the area in 2001. Several flat rides were added in 2002 and a river rapids ride called Blizzard River was added in 2003. In 2005, the Paradise Island water park was upgraded and retitled Six Flags Hurricane Harbor. The transition from Paradise Island to Hurricane Harbor saw the addition of a new Tornado water slide as well as renovations to existing attractions and buildings. Tony Hawk's Halfpipe water slide was added in 2008.

In 2010, Six Flags America renovated the Hurricane Bay wave pool deck, adding a new stamped, concrete deck and additional shading. Also the same year, the Thomas Town family area opened featuring eight rides and attractions all themed to Thomas the Tank Engine. The  area was billed as North America's largest Thomas Town and marked Six Flags America's largest expansion in more than a decade. Several months later, Six Flags would announce the removal of several licensed agreements as a result of restructuring following the company's emergence from bankruptcy. Thomas the Tank Engine, Tony Hawk, The Wiggles and Evel Knievel themes would be removed from all Six Flags parks beginning in 2011. At Six Flags America, Thomas Town was renamed Whistlestop Park and Tony Hawk's Halfpipe slide was renamed Halfpipe.

For 2012, the park added Apocalypse, a stand-up roller coaster from Bolliger & Mabillard, which featured two inversions and a ten-story drop. The roller coaster had previously operated as Iron Wolf at Six Flags Great America.

In 2013, the park added the six-slide complex Bonzai Pipelines to Hurricane Harbor.

In 2014, Six Flags re-themed a section of the park to feature Mardi Gras. The area would feature a new roller coaster named Ragin' Cajun and a set of Flying Scooters named French Quarter Flyers. Like Apocalypse, Ragin' Cajun was relocated from Six Flags Great America and it was placed in the former location of Two Face: The Flip Side which was removed from the park in 2007. The Mardi Gras section replaced Southwest Territory and the area's existing rides were rethemed to match the new Mardi Gras theme. Tower of Doom, for example, was renamed Voodoo Drop.

In 2015, a flat ride called Bourbon Street Fireball was added. This ride is commonly known as a Super Loop. Similar rides were also added to three other Six Flags parks.

In 2016, Six Flags America added a new family water play structure to Hurricane Harbor named Splashwater Falls, which replaced the former Crocodile Cal's Beach House.

Six Flags America announced on September 1, 2016 that they would be adding a Funtime Starflyer model, similar to the many SkyScreamer rides at other locations in the chain. At 24 stories (~250 feet), Wonder Woman: Lasso of Truth is the tallest ride in the park.

Announced in August 2018, Apocalypse was converted into a floorless coaster and renamed Firebird for the 2019 season.

Location

Themed sections

Six Flags America is divided into seven themed areas inspired by the different extremes of the United States, as well as fictional settings like the City of Gotham, and Looney Tunes: Movie Town.

Main Street 1776
Main Street 1776, also known as Liberty Street, or just Main Street, is inspired by Colonial North America set during the American Revolution. The buildings feature colonial design and host stores and restaurants. A replica of the Liberty Bell is featured at the entrance of the street.

Chesapeake
In Chesapeake guests can experience the motifs that surround life on the Chesapeake Bay. It embodies life on the water, featuring Life Savers and fishing nets caught on drift-wood. It is home to Shipwreck Falls, Firebird, and Roar. This area was split into two different sections, Skull Island and Olde Boston until Olde Boston was brought back in 2022. Skull Island focused heavily on the inclusion of pirates.

Olde Boston 
A colonial themed area.

Looney Tunes Movie Town

Looney Tunes Movie Town is inspired by the Looney Tunes cartoons of the 1930s and 1940s and the aesthetic of the era. It allows guests the chance to visit the homes of the cartoons' stars, such as Bugs Bunny and Granny. The "town" features the Great Chase, a children's coaster that takes guests through the set of the next Looney Tunes cartoon being filmed, starring Wile E. Coyote and the Road Runner.

Mardi Gras
Formerly South West Territory, Mardi Gras is supposed to be an all year New Orleans Mardi Gras celebration. Added to the park in 2014, the new themed land features the Ragin' Cajun, a wild mouse coaster where guests are trying to escape the attack of alligators in the Bayou. This land also features The Wild One, a wooden coaster that turned 100 years old in 2017, as well as the Bourbon Street Fireball, a Larson International a 22M Giant Loop flat ride, themed to Fireball.

Gotham City
Added in the year 2000, Gotham City is a land that allows guests to experience the dark and dirty industrial district of DC Comics' most notorious city. Guests can be held hostage by The Joker and forced to ride his Jinxed carnival coaster. They can soar above the clouds with Superman, on the Superman - Ride of Steel, or hope to stay dry while rushing down the Penguin's Blizzard River.

Coyote Creek
Recreating the pioneer days of the American frontier, the land drops guests in the frontier town of Coyote Creek. Entertainment and attractions include Renegade Rapids, a white water rafting ride down the dangerous rivers of the west inspired by the Colorado River. Coyote Creek is home to the Crazy Horse Saloon, a nod to the western saloons where cowboys used to drink and relax.

Current rides

Roller coasters

Flat rides

Kiddie Rides
Six Flags America's Kid Sections are Looney Tunes Movie Town and Whistlestop Park. 
Former Kid's Area was Thomas Town that only operated during the 2010 season.

Six Flags Hurricane Harbor
Hurricane Harbor is a water park located within Six Flags America and has no additional charge for entry. It was known as Paradise Island until 2005 when it was rebranded Hurricane Harbor.

Former attractions

Roller coasters

Rides
Including Former Hurricane Harbor Water slides

Rehabs
These rides were renamed following an improvement to the ride

See also

Incidents at Six Flags parks

References

External links

Six Flags America official website

 
1974 establishments in Maryland
Buildings and structures in Prince George's County, Maryland
America
Amusement parks in Maryland
Tourist attractions in Prince George's County, Maryland
Amusement parks opened in 1974